Yazid ibn Abi Kabsha al-Saksaki was an Arab military commander and provincial governor for the Umayyad Caliphate.

He was the son of Haywil ibn Yasar, surnamed Abu Kabsha, a member of the Syrian tribal nobility and an adherent of the Umayyads during the Second Fitna. Yazid served as sahib al-shurta for Caliph Abd al-Malik ibn Marwan (r. 685–705), campaigned against the Kharijites in Iraq in 698, and was appointed by the governor of Iraq, al-Hajjaj ibn Yusuf, as head of his shurta in Wasit. In 712/3 he led a campaign against the Byzantine Empire, and after the death of Hajjaj in 714, he succeeded him briefly as governor of Iraq. Caliph Sulayman ibn Abd al-Malik (r. 715–717) then sent him to Sind, where he dismissed and imprisoned the incumbent governor, Muhammad ibn Qasim. Yazid died in Sind shortly after his arrival there.

He had a brother Ziyad, of whom nothing is known, but his nephew Sari ibn Ziyad was among the pro-Yemeni leaders during the Third Fitna.

References

Sources 
 

7th-century births
715 deaths
8th-century Arabs
Kinda
Umayyad governors of Iraq
Umayyad governors of Sind
Umayyad people of the Arab–Byzantine wars